Gobius leucomelas is a species of goby native to the western Indian Ocean where it is only known from off of the coasts of Eritrea.

References

Endemic fauna of Eritrea
leucomelas
Fish of the Red Sea
Fish of Africa
Tropical fish
Fish described in 1868
Taxa named by Wilhelm Peters